Chimba skink or Chimban mabuya (Trachylepis chimbana) is a species of skink found in Namibia and Angola.

References

Trachylepis
Reptiles described in 1887
Taxa named by George Albert Boulenger